Watch the Throne is a collaborative studio album by American rappers Jay-Z and Kanye West, collectively known as The Throne. It was released on August 8, 2011, through Roc-A-Fella Records, Roc Nation, and Def Jam Recordings. Prior to the release, Jay-Z and West had collaborated on various singles, and with the latter as a producer on the former's work. They originally sought to record a five-song EP together, but the project eventually evolved into a full-length album. The album features guest appearances from Frank Ocean, The-Dream, Beyoncé and Mr Hudson. It also features vocal contributions from Kid Cudi, Seal, Justin Vernon, Elly Jackson, Connie Mitchell, Charlie Wilson and Pete Rock, among others, and samples of vocals by soul musicians Otis Redding and Curtis Mayfield.

Recording sessions took place at various locations and began in November 2010, with production led by West and a variety of high-profile producers, including Mike Dean, Swizz Beatz, Pete Rock, RZA, Jeff Bhasker, The Neptunes, and Q-Tip. Expanding on the dense production style of West's fifth studio album, My Beautiful Dark Twisted Fantasy (2010), Watch the Throne incorporates orchestral and progressive rock influences, unconventional samples, and dramatic melodies in its sound. The braggadocious lyrics exhibit themes of excellence, opulence, decadence, fame, materialism, power, and the burdens of success, as well as political and socioeconomic critique. The album also expresses other topics, such as Jay-Z's thoughts on fatherhood, West's reflection on being deemed a social villain, and their success as performers. Many writers interpreted the subject matter to concern the plight of African Americans struggling with financial success in America.

Seven singles were released for Watch the Throne, including "H•A•M", "Otis", "Lift Off", "No Church in the Wild", and the Billboard Hot 100 top five hit "Niggas in Paris", with all of the singles receiving music videos. Jay-Z and West embarked on the Watch the Throne Tour for promotion that spanned from October 2011 to June 2012 and became the highest-grossing hip hop concert tour in history. The album received highly positive reviews from music critics, who mostly praised the rappers' performances and the production. However, some reviewers found the lyrical content uninspiring.

Many critics and publications named Watch the Throne to their year-end best-of lists, including Rolling Stone and The Washington Post
. The album debuted at number one on the US Billboard 200, selling 436,000 copies in the first week, and broke the iTunes first week sales record at the time. It reached the top ten in 11 other countries, including Canada and the United Kingdom. It was also certified quintuple platinum in the United States by the Recording Industry Association of America (RIAA) in November 2020.

Background 
Jay-Z and Kanye West first worked together on the song "This Can't Be Life", from Jay-Z's 2000 album The Dynasty: Roc La Familia, produced by West, then on Jay-Z's 2001 album The Blueprint, which showcased West's distinctive style of hip hop production at the time. West's early production work on Jay-Z's music helped raise his profile in the music industry. While originally only viewed as a producer, West eventually was seen as both a viable rapper and producer thanks to the success of his debut album The College Dropout and its singles. West continued to be one of Jay-Z's main producers on subsequent albums such as The Black Album and Kingdom Come. Jay-Z appeared on Kanye's first two albums as well, and the two frequently collaborated. Further collaborative work by the two included singles such as "Swagga Like Us" from rapper T.I.'s Paper Trail, 
"Run This Town" from Jay-Z's The Blueprint 3, and both "Monster" and “So Appalled” from West's My Beautiful Dark Twisted Fantasy.

During the promotional stages of West's My Beautiful Dark Twisted Fantasy, a remix of the song "Power" surfaced featuring Jay-Z. Following this, Kanye West announced on Twitter his intention to drop a five-track EP with Jay-Z, titled Watch the Throne. Also according to the rapper, the track "Monster" was intended for the EP, though that failed to surface. It was later revealed by West that the project had been expanded into a full-length album in an October 2010 interview for MTV. He said in the interview that they planned to record in the south of France.

In an August 2011 radio interview with WEDR Jay-Z shared the meaning behind the album's title; 
"It's just protecting the music and the culture. It's people that's in the forefront of the music. Watch the Throne, like protect it. You just watch how popular music shift, and how hip-hop basically replaced rock & roll as the youth music. The same thing can happen to hip-hop. It can be replaced by other forms of music. So it's making sure that we put the effort into making the best product so we can contend with all this other music, with dance music that's dominating the charts right now and indie music that's dominating the festivals."

Recording 

Recording sessions for the album took place at Avex Recording Studio in Honolulu, Hawaii; Barford Estate in Sydney, Australia; Electric Lady Studios; The Mercer Hotel; MSR Studios; and Tribeca Grand Hotel in New York City; Le Meurice in Paris, France; and Real World Studios in Wiltshire, England. The songs "That's My Bitch" and "The Joy" were previously recorded for My Beautiful Dark Twisted Fantasy as early as July 2010. Production began in November 2010 in England and continued during available times in Jay-Z's and West's schedules at locations in Australia, Paris, Abu Dhabi, New York City, and Los Angeles. In an interview for Billboard, Jay-Z said that they often recorded in hotel rooms and that the album went through three iterations, as he and West had scaled back from their original musical direction. He noted difficulties in the recording process, including arguments with West regarding their direction. Following the release of lead single, "H•A•M" in January 2011, Jay-Z stated that the less-than-stellar reception caused a change in the production of the album. Jay-Z announced that it was unlikely that the track would ultimately make the album. The issues at the beginning of production had caused a delay in the release. In an interview for Rolling Stone, Jay-Z discussed their insistence on recording in person and attributed it to the delay in releasing the album, stating "If we were gonna do it, we were gonna do it together. No mailing it in".

The album's earlier sessions produced a little material that has made the final cut. West had brought a majority of his usual production crew onto the project, the same crew that had assisted in the creation of My Beautiful Dark Twisted Fantasy. One of the main exceptions was producer No I.D., who felt that the two artists weren't pushing forward enough with the music. In an interview with Complex, No I.D. commented about the project that "you're going to sell, because you're already big. But you guys are important to push this forward. Push intelligence and decadence and all of the above forward in a creative manner." While his advice was acknowledged to a degree, he ultimately had very little part in the finished project. In January 2011, they regrouped and rented a block of rooms at the Mercer Hotel in New York City and invited a select group of producers and recording artists. Chauncey "Hit-Boy" Hollis, who produced the track "Niggas in Paris", said of recording at the hotel, "There was music going on in every room. I had a room where I was cranking out beats, and then I'd go into the main room with Jay and [Kanye] and play beats for them. Kanye is really hands-on. I would come in with a beat and he'd be like, 'Take this out, slow it down.' It would make it sound 100 times better. Jay would then mumble different flows to the beat".

Parts of the album were recorded in New York City's Tribeca Grand Hotel. Recording artist and producer Ryan Leslie also confirmed his involvement in the recording of Watch the Throne. Producer 88-Keys reportedly played 20 of his beats to West and Jay, who only eventually used one on the finished album. The Wu-Tang Clan's RZA, who had worked on West's previous album, is credited as a producer on the track "New Day". Watch the Throne was mastered by producer and engineer Mike Dean at the Mercer Hotel.

Jay-Z and West worked with several guest recording artists, including Beyoncé, Frank Ocean, and Mr Hudson. "No Church in the Wild", the last song recorded for the album, was conceived by Jay-Z, West, and the song's producer 88-Keys throughout most of June. Producer and recording artist The-Dream sings a verse on the track using AutoTune. The song features R&B singer Frank Ocean, who released his debut mixtape nostalgia,ULTRA in early 2011 to critical acclaim. The release of the mixtape interested Jay-Z and West. Jay-Z's wife Beyoncé recommended the involvement of the singer in particular, who appears on both "No Church in the Wild" and "Made in America." Ocean admitted that Jay-Z has intentionally intimidated him during recording sessions but declared his enjoyment of working with the two. Ocean mused about the project:

"I rarely do collabs, so that's just one of the ones you absolutely do. It's like a no-brainer. I didn't really think about any of it. The last thing on my mind was working with artists who I've held in high esteem for years. [...] I worked with Jay on his solo album before I did the Watch the Throne sessions. The second time I went it was Barry Weiss, Jay, Beyoncé, Kanye, couple other people, it was a pretty heavy room." 

"Lift Off" was recorded in Sydney, Australia. In early May 2011, rumors arose that "Lift Off" was to feature Bruno Mars who had recorded vocals. It was reported that the song would be released as the lead single from the album. However, Mars never appeared on the song and Beyoncé sang several lines during the chorus instead. Additional vocalists Elly Jackson, Connie Mitchell, and Justin Vernon provide the hook on "That's My Bitch", Vernon had previously appeared on West's album My Beautiful Dark Twisted Fantasy, when West sampled Vernon's band Bon Iver's song "Woods", Vernon also provided additional vocals on songs such as "Dark Fantasy" and "Monster". Swizz Beatz, who produced "Welcome to the Jungle", also provided background vocals to the track, and Kid Cudi contributed additional vocals to "The Joy" and "Illest Motherfucker Alive," bonus tracks on the album's deluxe edition. One of the tracks that was recorded but didn't make the cut for the album was "Living So Italian." It apparently sampled Andrea Bocelli's "Con te partirò" and was described as catchy but for unknown reasons, the song never made it onto the album.

In 2013, Jay-Z released his twelfth studio album Magna Carta... Holy Grail, in an interview he revealed that two songs on the album were initially recorded for Watch the Throne, the song "Oceans" which features Frank Ocean and the song "Holy Grail" which went on to feature Justin Timberlake (Although Timberlake's contribution to the track was not anticipated at the time, until the duo collaborated on Timberlake's 2013 comeback single "Suit & Tie" and "Murder" from The 20/20 Experience and The 20/20 Experience – 2 of 2 respectively). West and Jay-Z argued for four days about having them included on the Watch the Throne, however West eventually relented and the duo recorded "No Church in the Wild" and "Made in America". In an interview with Zane Lowe, Jay-Z said: "[There were] no lyrics on 'Holy Grail' and I recorded 'Oceans' and I played those records for Kanye," Jay explained. "And he was like, 'No those have to go on Watch the Throne,' so we spent four days arguing about those records and I was explaining to him why it wasn't right for this project and I had a whole idea for making this album called Magna Carta... Holy Grail, the "Holy Grail" part of the name came after."

Music and lyrics 

Julian Benbow of The Boston Globe writes that the album's music is as "massive, dour, and relentlessly unconventional" as that of West's previous 2010 album My Beautiful Dark Twisted Fantasy. Music writer Robert Christgau describes West's production as "a funkier and less ornate variant of the prog-rap of 2010's acclaimed My Beautiful Dark Twisted Fantasy". Music journalist Jody Rosen characterizes the music as "vast, dark and booming," commenting that West "continues in the sonic vein he introduced in My Beautiful Dark Twisted Fantasy, lacing the songs with rock dynamics, layering his beats with eerie vocal chorales, piling on proggy flourishes." Conversely, Matthew Cole of Slant Magazine finds West's "knack for dramatic, melodically sophisticated tracks [...] channeled away from the Olympian scale" of his previous album "and toward the more commercial vein of Jay-Z's recent work," which he attributes to West splitting production work with several other producers. On the songs' structure, Cole states, "every track eschews the standard verse-hook-repeat format in favor of more dynamic material."

Music journalist Alexis Petridis comments that the album incorporates "unlikely samples." Jon Caramanica of The New York Times writes that its production "can be roughly segmented into three categories," noting "Southern-inflected tracks" such as "Niggas in Paris" and "H•A•M", "moody and harsh numbers" like "Who Gon Stop Me" and "Why I Love You", and "the nostalgia that creeps over much of this album, giving it a sonic through-line and mission statement." Pitchfork's Tom Breihan perceives "pure orchestral excess" on some of its songs and describes the album's musical scope as "a tribute to [West's] distinctive taste and sense of style."

The album features themes of opulence, fame, materialism, power, and the burdens of success. Jay-Z's and West's lyrics include boasts of obscene wealth, grandiosity, and social commentary. Sputnikmusic's Tyler Fisher describes Watch the Throne as "an album centered around larger-than-life egos." Robert Christgau notes "regal grandiosity" and "glory" as primary themes on the album. Andy Kellman of Allmusic characterizes much of the album's lyrical content as "ruthless flaunting of material wealth and carte blanche industry resources." Rob Harvilla of Spin views that their lyrics express elitism, narcissism, "relentless capitalism," and "smug yet undeniable greatness."

Music critic Greg Kot views that the album is about "mutual admiration" and writes of the rappers' respective personas, "Jay-Z is about imperious flow, bridging his gritty past life on the streets with his current status as a cultural tastemaker and business mogul. [...] West is more desperate, transparent, awkward, vulnerable." Music critic Nathan Rabin states that Jay-Z and West "are a study in contrasts: the businessman and the bohemian, the faithful husband and the drugged-up playboy, the walking press release and the loose cannon. Jay-Z is tidy. Kanye is nothing but rough edges." Jon Caramanica writes similarly, "breaking [...] old barriers is a means to acceptance and stability" for Jay-Z, while "West sounds lonely" with his fame, adding that "For Mr. West every flash of Dionysian extreme is tempered by the realization of its hollowness." In his article "Brag Like That" for Barnes & Noble, Robert Christgau comments that "Jay-Z is a grown man and Kanye is not" on the album and elaborates on their lyrics, stating:

Their lyrics also exhibit political and socioeconomic context, which Jody Rosen denotes as "serious, sober, weighty." Nitsuh Abebe of New York views that the album is "about the relationship of black American men to wealth, power, and success. [...] a portrait of two black men thinking through the idea of success in America." He compares it to Yinka Shonibare's 1998 piece Diary of a Victorian Dandy, "in which the artist luxuriates in all the genteel pleasures of the time." Randall Roberts of the Los Angeles Times notes "musings on the spoils of riches and the chaos that accompanies it," adding that "[the] tension between worshiping the spirit and celebrating the bounty drives Watch the Throne [...] The record questions faith while clinging to heritage and family, places this moment in an historical context, wonders on the mystery, power and confusion of the gilded life — while rolling around in amulets." Writer Kitty Empire interprets it to be about "black power [...] conceived as a swaggering taunt of achievement, in line with both men's previous works, which routinely double as shopping guides. [...] [T]hey need to humanise all the conspicuous consumption." Claire Suddath of Time views the rappers' "bacchanal celebration of the finer things in life" as secondary to the theme of "two men grappling with what it means to be successful and black in a nation that still thinks of them as second class."

Songs 

The opening track "No Church in the Wild" features a cinematic production style. Singers Frank Ocean and The-Dream lend their voices to the album's grim opener, which sets the mood with a gnarled guitar sample. Over the rock-centric, rolling production, both rappers muse over familiar themes of loyalty, sexuality and maternal solidarity. On the album, the song closes with a segment of Italian avant-prog band Orchestra Njervudarov's 1979 piece "Tristessa", which reappears at the end of several other songs. The pop-oriented "Lift Off" features baroque strings and a chorus sung by Beyoncé Knowles, accompanied with synthesizers. The song contains horns and martial drums as Knowles sings, "We gon' take it to the moon/ Take it to the stars." "Niggas in Paris" incorporates staccato orchestration and fizzing industrial noise, topping it all off with a menacing beat and icy synthesizer notes. The track features an unusual sampling of dialogue from the 2007 film Blades of Glory, notably the "we're gonna skate to one song and one song only" line. West and Jay-Z's lyrics frame their rags to riches story on the song.

"Otis" samples Otis Redding's 1966 song "Try a Little Tenderness", manipulating it into a rhythm track with Otis Redding's vocals and grunts. The sample is used in a way that is reminiscent to past Kanye productions, like the tracks found on his album The College Dropout. Redding's vocals are chopped up so thoroughly that his voice serves as a mere melodic riff on the track, with both rappers promptly rapping over it in a braggadocious fashion. "Gotta Have It", produced by The Neptunes, incorporates chopped-up James Brown vocal samples and Eastern flute melodies. The song contains haunting backing vocals and an accompanying tambourine with the two rappers trading verses with the vocal riff playing over them. Much like "Otis", the track features sliced-up vocal snippets and an aggressive bass backing, with the two rappings trading lines and making references to the Yung Chris song "Racks" and other contemporary rap trends.

On "New Day", they address future sons about fame. It references the line "me and the RZA connect" from Raekwon's 1995 song "Incarcerated Scarfaces", which was also produced by RZA. The track incorporates a sample of Nina Simone's 1965 song "Feeling Good" through an Auto-Tune voice processor. Both rappers discuss their futures as fathers on the track, flowing smoothly over mellow, lightly psychedelic synthesizer tones. Both Justin Vernon and La Roux appear on "That's My Bitch", spitting off hooks over a quick, melodic beat, with West at his most abrasive lyrically. On "Welcome to the Jungle", Jay-Z laments personal losses and overcoming struggles. Sharing the name with a Guns N' Roses track, Jay describes himself as the "black Axl Rose" over a jittery, treble-heavy Swizz Beatz production.

"Who Gon Stop Me" features bombastic production and samples Flux Pavilion's 2011 song "I Can't Stop", reinforced with heavy synthesizer and tone shifts. The song utilizes an often experimental, bass-driven and dub-step influenced style of composition, with West forcefully rapping lines like "this is something like the Holocaust". "Murder to Excellence" addresses black-on-black crime and limited social mobility for African Americans. Midway through the song the beat switches up, with Kanye musing over the horrors of black-on-black violence in the first half, and Jay-Z delivering equally meditated comments on black excellence on the more choir-heavy second half. A sample from Indiggo's "LA LA LA" can be heard on the song. At 5 minutes in length, the complete "Murder to Excellence" is the longest track on the album.

"Made in America" has themes of family life and the American Dream, with Jay-Z and West discussing their respective rises to fame, while acknowledging those who helped and inspired them. The song has been described as an understated soft-pop track with influence from Michael Jackson and his 1985 charity single "We Are the World". Ocean's hook pays tribute to Martin Luther King Jr., Coretta Scott King, Malcolm X, Betty Shabazz and Jesus on one of the album's more serene tracks. Jay-Z muses on his drug-dealing past with lines like "our apple pie was supplied by Arm & Hammer", with West's verse describing his conflict with fame. "Why I Love You" has Jay-Z lamenting betrayal and how his past protégés failed to maintain without him. The track contains a "sledgehammer beat" which is built around French house duo Cassius' 2010 single "I <3 U So". West's production continues in the sonic vein he introduced in My Beautiful Dark Twisted Fantasy, lacing the song with rock dynamics, layering the beat with eerie vocal chorales in the style of progressive rock songs.

Release and promotion 

Watch the Throne was released by Roc-A-Fella Records, Roc Nation, and Def Jam Recordings, Jay-Z's and West's respective record labels. On July 4, 2011, it was made available to pre-order on Life + Times, Jay-Z's lifestyle webzine, which redirected to Island Def Jam's website that featured the deluxe version available for $16.99, standard CD for $13.99, a deluxe digital version for $14.99, and standard digital album for $11.99. On July 22, its pre-order was made available on the iTunes Store. Internationally the album was released digitally on August 8 exclusively through iTunes, while its physical release was made available on August 12. Its deluxe CD edition was sold exclusively by Best Buy through August 23, when it became available at other retailers. The sales strategy received criticism from other retailers, who accused the labels of giving preferential treatment to iTunes and Best Buy. One of the most anticipated releases in 2011, Watch the Throne became one of the few major label albums in the Internet age to avoid a leak.

On July 7, 2011, Jay-Z hosted a private listening session at the Mercer Hotel in New York City, previewing the album's songs from his MacBook Pro for a select group of reporters and music journalists. It was also exclusive to two teenage fans who had won access to the session for being the first people to pre-order the album through Jay-Z's Life + Times website. The album's cover and artwork, both designed by Italian designer Riccardo Tisci, were also premiered at the session. Benjamin Meadows-Ingrim of Billboard, who attended the session, said of the previewed material, "The songs were dramatic and boastful, with Jay-Z often taking the lead lyrically, and the collection showcased the differences between the two artists – Jay-Z, the technical marksman, and Kanye, the emotive chest beater." On August 1, Jay-Z and West held a listening session for the album at the Rose Center for Earth and Space in New York City's American Museum of Natural History. The session premiered the album in its entirety and featured attendance from journalists, models, industry types, and recording artists such as Busta Rhymes, 88-Keys, and Beyoncé Knowles. On August 28, Jay-Z and West performed "Otis" at the 2011 MTV Video Music Awards.

Jay-Z and West promoted Watch the Throne with a 34-date, North American concert tour produced by Live Nation, which began on October 29 and concluded on December 18, 2010. By the end of 2011 the tour had grossed $48.3 million making it the then highest grossing hip-hop tour (until being surpassed by Summer Sixteen Tour) and the eighth highest-grossing tour of 2011.

Singles

Watch the Throne spawned seven official singles, with varying degrees of success. Following West's announcement via his Twitter account, "H•A•M" was officially released as a digital download in January 2011 as the lead single. It charted at number 23 on the US Billboard Hot 100. In July 2011, "Otis" became the second single when it was premiered on Funkmaster Flex's Hot 97 radio show and subsequently leaked to the Internet. It was sent to rhythmic contemporary and urban contemporary radio on August 9. Its cover art was created by Riccardo Tisci. "Otis" reached number 12 on the  Hot 100. A music video for the song was filmed by director Spike Jonze in Los Angeles. Third single "Lift Off" was sent to US urban radio on August 23 of the same year. The track peaked on the US Bubbling Under Hot 100 Singles at position 6.

The album's fourth and fifth singles were released simultaneously; in September 2011, "Why I Love You" was sent to US rhythmic radio, and "Niggas in Paris" was sent to both rhythmic and urban radio. "Why I Love You" served as a European-centric single while "Niggas in Paris" was promoted as a domestic single. "Niggas in Paris" peaked at number five on the Hot 100. "Niggas in Paris" was sent to Top 40/Mainstream radio on November 8. By February 2012, it had reached digital sales of two million in the United States. The song was promoted with a music video directed by West himself, featuring concert footage.

The sixth single was "Gotta Have It", which impacted Urban radio on December 6, 2011, and Rhythmic radio on January 31, 2012. Seventh and final single "No Church in the Wild" impacted Urban radio on March 20, 2012. Romain Gavras directed a music video for "No Church" though it featured none of the featured performers. "Gotta Have It" peaked at position 69 on the Hot 100, with "No Church in the Wild" peaking at 72. Though not released as a single, "Who Gon Stop Me" peaked at 44 on the chart.

Critical reception 

Watch the Throne received positive reviews from music critics. At Metacritic, which assigns a normalized rating out of 100 to reviews from mainstream publications, the album received an average score of 76, based on 42 reviews. Nathan Rabin of The A.V. Club wrote that "exhilarating messiness and go-for-broke spontaneity infect Jay-Z and push him outside his comfort zone and into a realm of intense emotional reflection." Pitchforks Tom Breihan felt that it "works best when Jay and Kanye are just talking about how great they are," adding that "Kanye is this album's obvious guiding force ... He displays levels of unequaled audacity." Claire Suddath of Time called it "a beautifully decadent album by two of hip-hop's finest artists—men with a lot of things to say and a lot of money to spend." Neil McCormick of The Daily Telegraph praised West's "attention to detail" and found their "wit and absurdity [...] entirely suited to the epic scale of productions." Kitty Empire of The Observer stated, "Some find this sort of branded gloating distasteful, but at their best both rappers can still make you laugh." Randall Roberts of the Los Angeles Times deemed it "a cocksure, fiery, smart, if problematic, collaboration that showcases the pair's distinct lyrical skills." Julian Benbow of The Boston Globe observed "an undeniable synergy that they embraced for this project." AllMusic editor Andy Kellman called it "an audacious spectacle of vacuous pomposity as well as one of tremendous lyrical depth."

Slant Magazines Matthew Cole was less impressed, believing West had contributed a "powerhouse production" but that the album "requires you to tolerate the artists' self-mythologizing and put up with their sometimes awkward attempts at experimentation." Andy Gill of The Independent was more critical and found their rapping "pretty mediocre", partly because "too often here their complacent, back-slapping laxity leaves tracks floundering." In the Chicago Tribune, Greg Kot found the record plagued by Jay-Z and West's "self-regard", writing that "they urge listeners to 'watch the throne,' and gaze in awe on their good fortune." Jody Rosen of Rolling Stone felt that "on a record this ambitious, this sonically bold, it's a shame two of music's greatest storytellers don't extend their gaze beyond their own luxe lives." Sasha Frere-Jones of The New Yorker stated, "Weed the album down to a healthy ten, and [it] doesn't become either classic or coherent, but it does work as an entertaining document of two wildly creative, not particularly wound-up friends."

Accolades

Critics' rankings 

Watch the Throne was one of the top-ranked albums in year-end lists by music critics and publications. Q ranked the album number six in its list of the Top 50 Albums of 2011. Rolling Stone named it the second-best album in its year-end list, commenting that "What could have been a crash-and-burn anticlimax turned out to be as fun as any record in a dog's age. From the cinematic 'No Church in the Wild' to the Stax-soul update 'Otis,' Throne testifies to Kanye West's talent for beats both iconoclastic and pop-savvy." Claire Suddath of Time ranked it number three on her top-10 albums list and called it "a beautifully decadent album". Chris Richards of The Washington Post ranked it number two on his list and stated, "Instead of blushing over their embarrassment of riches, pop's most intriguing partnership delivered a self-congratulatory opus that was adventurous enough to remind us that they're rap visionaries first, 1 percent bazillionaires second. The A.V. Club ranked it number nine on its year-end list, commenting that "Watch The Throne thrives on the bristling tension between Kanye's live-wire energy and rule-breaking abandon, and Jay-Z's innate cautiousness. It's an album of the moment—a point underlined by the presence of Frank Ocean on two tracks—yet it has the substance to endure." Stereogum placed Watch the Throne at number 10 on its list of the "Top 50 albums of 2011" while Pitchfork placed the album at number 21 on its list.

In 2012, Complex named the album one of the classic albums of the last decade. In January 2015, the album was placed at number 8 on Billboards list of "The 20 Best Albums of the 2010s (So Far)". In 2018, Revolt listed the album at number one on their list of  the 10 rap collaboration albums. In 2019, Billboard named Watch the Throne the biggest collaborative album of all time, asserting, "From the iconic album artwork to the brash, decadent lyrical themes, esteemed guest list, and recording around the globe, the Throne would set the standard for what a pristine rap album should embody at the highest of levels."

Industry awards 
Watch the Throne received nominations for Best Rap Album and Best Recording Package at the 54th Annual Grammy Awards in 2012. It lost the former to West's My Beautiful Dark Twisted Fantasy. "Otis" was nominated for Best Rap Performance and Best Rap Song, winning the former. At the 55th Annual Grammy Awards in 2013, "Niggas in Paris" won Best Rap Performance and Best Rap Song, and "No Church in the Wild" won Best Rap/Sung Collaboration.

Commercial performance 
Watch the Throne debuted at No. 1 on the US Billboard 200 chart, selling 436,000 copies in its first week. This became Jay-Z's 12th number-one album and West's fifth number-one album in the US. This also became the second highest debut week of 2011, while its first week digital sales of 321,000 downloads served as the second highest one-week sales tally at the time. Watch the Throne broke the US iTunes Store's one-week sales record at the time when it sold nearly 290,000 downloads.  The album also reached number one on the US Top R&B/Hip-Hop Albums and the US Top Rap Albums charts. In its second week, the album remained at number one on the chart, selling an additional 177,000 copies. In its third week, the album dropped to number two on the chart, selling 94,000 more copies. In its fourth week, the album dropped to number four on the chart, selling 80,000 copies. In 2011, Watch the Throne was the ninth best-selling album in the US, and the first collaborative album to make the year-end top ten in Nielsen SoundScan history. It was also the fourth top selling album on iTunes in 2011. As of July 2013, the album has sold 1,573,000 copies in the US, according to Nielsen SoundScan. On November 23, 2020, the album was certified quintuple platinum by the Recording Industry Association of America (RIAA) for combined sales and album-equivalent units of over five million units in the United States.

Watch the Throne was also a success outside the US. In Canada, the album debuted at number one on the Canadian Albums Chart, selling 25,000 copies in its first week. In its second week, the album remained at number one on the chart, selling 15,900 more copies. In Australia, the album peaked at number two on the Australian Albums Chart and number one on the Australian Urban Albums Chart. In the United Kingdom, the album debuted at number three on the UK Albums Chart and number one on the UK R&B Albums Chart. The album topped the UK R&B Albums Chart for six non-consecutive weeks between 2011-12. In addition, Watch the Throne peaked at number one on the Norwegian Albums Chart and the Swiss Albums Chart. The album peaked at number two on the German Albums Chart the Danish Albums Chart, and at number three on the Scottish Albums Chart. It also debuted within the top ten on the Belgian Albums Chart, the Dutch Albums Chart, the French Albums Chart, the Irish Albums Chart, the Russian Albums Chart and the New Zealand Albums Chart.

Track listing 

Notes
  signifies a co-producer
  signifies an additional producer
  signifies an additional vocal producer
"Lift Off" features additional vocals by Seal, Mr Hudson, Don Jazzy, Bankulli and Ricardo Lewis.
"Gotta Have It" features additional vocals by Kid Cudi.
"That's My Bitch" features additional vocals by La Roux, Connie Mitchell and Bon Iver.
"Welcome to the Jungle" features additional vocals by Swizz Beatz and Acapella Soul.
"Who Gon Stop Me" features additional vocals by Mr Hudson, Swizz Beatz, and Verse Simmonds.
"Murder to Excellence" features additional vocals by Kid Cudi.
"Illest Motherfucker Alive" features additional vocals by Kid Cudi, Bankulli, and Aude Cardona.
"H•A•M" features additional vocals by Aude Cardona and Jacob Lewis Smith.
"The Joy" features additional vocals by Pete Rock, Kid Cudi, and Charlie Wilson.

Sample credits
 "No Church in the Wild" contains samples from "K-Scope", written and performed by Phil Manzanera; samples of "Sunshine Help Me", written and performed by Spooky Tooth; and samples of "Don't Tell a Lie About Me (and I Won't Tell the Truth About You)", written and performed by James Brown.
 "Lift Off" contains samples of dialogue from the Apollo 11 launch as spoken by Jack King
 "Niggas in Paris" contains samples of the Reverend W. A. Donaldson recording "Baptizing Scene"; and dialogue between Will Ferrell and Jon Heder from the 2007 comedy film Blades of Glory.
 "Otis" contains samples of "Try a Little Tenderness", written by [Jimmy Campbell and Reg Connelly, Harry M. Woods] and performed by Otis Redding; samples of "Don't Tell a Lie About Me (and I Won't Tell the Truth About You)", written and performed by James Brown; and elements of "Top Billin'", written and performed by Audio Two.
 "Gotta Have It" contains elements of "Don't Tell a Lie About Me (and I Won't Tell the Truth About You)"; samples of "People Get Up and Drive Your Funky Soul"; and elements of "My Thang", written and performed by James Brown.
 "New Day" contains samples of "Feeling Good", written and performed by Nina Simone.
 "That's My Bitch" contains samples of "Get Up, Get Into It, Get Involved", written and performed by James Brown; and samples of "Apache", written and performed by Incredible Bongo Band.
 "Who Gon Stop Me" contains samples of "I Can't Stop", written and performed by Flux Pavilion.
 "Murder to Excellence" contains samples of "LA LA LA", written and performed by The Indiggo Twins; and samples of "Celie Shaves Mr./Scarification" from the 1985 drama film The Color Purple, written and performed by Quincy Jones.
 "Why I Love You" contains samples of "I Love You So", written and performed by Cassius.
 "Primetime" contains samples of "Action", written and performed by Orange Krush.
 "The Joy" contains samples of "The Makings of You (Live)", written and performed by Curtis Mayfield; and elements of "Different Strokes", written and performed by Syl Johnson.

Personnel 
Credits for Watch the Throne adapted from liner notes.

 88-Keys – producer
 Virgil Abloh – art direction
 Acapella Soul – vocals
 Mat Arnold – assistant
 Bankulli – vocals
 Beyoncé – featured artist
 Jeff Bhasker – producer
 Vincent Biessy – creative input
 Chris "Hitchcock" Chorney – cello
 Carol Corless – package production
 Don Crawley – A&R
 Andrew Dawson – engineer
 Mike Dean – additional production, cello arrangement, engineer, keyboards, mastering, mixing, musician, producer
 Don Jazzy – vocals
 The-Dream – vocals
 Laura Escudé – violin
 Noah Goldstein – engineer, mixing, producer
 Alex Haldi – art producer
 Hit-Boy – producer, programming
 Gaylord Holomalia – assistant
 Elly Jackson – vocals
 Jay-Z – executive producer, primary artist, writer
 Sham "Sak Pase" Joseph – producer
 Kyambo "Hip Hop" Joshua – executive producer
 Kid Cudi – vocals
 Anthony Kilhoffer – additional production, engineer, mixing, producer, programming

 Brent Kolatalo – engineer
 Ken Lewis – additional production, engineer, musician
 Ricardo Lewis – vocals
 LMFAO – mixing, programming
 Mr Hudson – featured artist, vocals
 Connie Mitchell – vocals
 Christian Mochizuki – assistant
 The Neptunes – producer
 Frank Ocean – writer, featured artist
 Q-Tip – additional production, mixing
 Otis Redding – featured artist
 Gee Roberson – executive producer
 Todd Russell – art producer
 S1 – producer
 Lenny S. – A&R
 Seal – vocals
 Pawel Sek – engineer
 Chris Soper – assistant engineer
 Swizz Beatz – producer, vocals
 Bu Thiam – A&R
 Pat Thrall – engineer
 Riccardo Tisci – artwork, creative director
 Scott Townsend – art producer
 Justin Vernon – vocals
 Blair Wells – mixing
 Kanye West – executive producer, primary artist, producer, writer
 Kristen Yiengst – art producer

Charts

Weekly charts

Year-end charts

Decade-end charts

Certifications

Release history

See also
List of Billboard 200 number-one albums of 2011
Kanye West albums discography
Jay-Z albums discography
Watch the Throne Tour
Watch the Stove

Notes

References

Bibliography

External links
 
 Watch the Throne at Metacritic

2011 albums
Jay-Z albums
Kanye West albums
Def Jam Recordings albums
Roc-A-Fella Records albums
Roc Nation albums
Collaborative albums
Albums produced by 88-Keys
Albums produced by Hit-Boy
Albums produced by Jeff Bhasker
Albums produced by Kanye West
Albums produced by Lex Luger
Albums produced by Mike Dean (record producer)
Albums produced by the Neptunes
Albums produced by Q-Tip (musician)
Albums produced by RZA
Albums produced by Southside (record producer)
Albums produced by Swizz Beatz
Albums produced by Symbolyc One
Albums recorded at Electric Lady Studios